This article describes the group stage of the 2020–21 LEN Champions League.

The LEN Champions League preliminary round began on 12 December 2020 and concluded on 24 April 2021.

Draw
The draw for the group phase took place in Rome on 19 October 2020.

Format
LEN decided to play the 10 match-days of the 2020–21 LEN Champions League preliminary round in bubble format in three rounds, using two venues at each occasion. The ten match-days will be played in three rounds at two venues each time.

Teams of the same group will contest three match-days, one time four, where the participants will be isolated for the entire duration of event because of the COVID-19 pandemic.

Groups
The matchdays were 3 phase. The first phase of matches were played between 14 and 17 December, the second were played between 1–5 March 2021, the third were played between 19 and 22 April 2021. The matches in the Group B were started one day later.

Times were CET/CEST, as listed by LEN (local times, if different, are in parentheses).

Group A

Group B

Notes

References

External links
, len.microplustiming.com

Preliminary Round